Lindqvist Nunatak is a nunatak  south of the Chevreul Cliffs, rising to  in the eastern part of the Shotton Snowfield, Shackleton Range, Antarctica. It was photographed from the air by the U.S. Navy in 1967 and surveyed by the British Antarctic Survey, 1968–71. In association with the names of pioneers of polar life and travel grouped in this area, it was named by the UK Antarctic Place-Names Committee after Frans W. Lindqvist, the Swedish inventor of the Primus stove in 1892.

References

Nunataks of Coats Land